Korred may refer to:
Korrigan, a fairy or dwarf in Breton folklore
Korred (Dungeons & Dragons), a Fey in Dungeons & Dragons